Ariselu or Arisa is an Indian sweet from Andhra Pradesh, Odisha, Telangana. It is also called Kajjaya in Kannada, Adhirasam  in Tamil Nadu, Neyyappam in Kerala ,Anarsa in Marathi, arsa or anarsa in Uttarakhand, Bihar and Jharkhand.

Ariselu is a traditional dish and it is prepared during festivities like Sankranti, Dusshera, Deepavali, Marriage

Ingredients
It is made out of rice flour, jaggery (Bellamu in Telugu) and ghee / edible oil. Jaggery may be replaced with granulated sugar.

Preparation

A dough is first prepared out of rice flour or ground soaked rice and molten jaggery. The dough is kneaded first and then flattened in small portions in a similar fashion as making breads such as poori or chapatti. These flattened portions are fried in ghee or oil. Finally, these are pressed in gingelly or sesame seed or poppy seeds.

Arsa in Garhwal 
Ariselu is also loved by the people of the Himalayas, the northern region of India. In north India, ariselu is known as "Arsa". Arsa mithai is very popular and one of the oldest sweets found in the entire nation by different names. In the Garhwal region of Uttarakhand, arsa is often made on all auspicious occasions. Arsa is a very popular sweet in Garhwal, Uttarakhand.

See also
List of Indian sweets and desserts
 Cuisine of Odisha
 Sunnundallu

References

Indian desserts
Andhra cuisine
Telangana cuisine
Odia cuisine